Jovita Moore (October 4, 1967 – October 28, 2021) was an American television news anchor who worked for WSB-TV in Atlanta, Georgia, from 1998 until her death.

Biography
Jovita Moore was born in New York City on October 4, 1967. Growing up, she enjoyed watching the news on television with her mother, Yvonne. She earned a Bachelor's degree from Bennington College and interned at The New York Times. Eventually, she got a Masters' degree for broadcast journalism at Columbia University.

Career 
In 1990, Moore began her newscasting career in Fort Smith, Arkansas for CBS affiliate KFSM-TV. After three years in Fort Smith, she would later move on to Memphis, Tennessee to work at NBC affiliate WMC-TV. She later moved to Atlanta, Georgia for ABC affiliate WSB-TV in 1998. In 2001, Moore won an Emmy for her news piece on cystic fibroids, which also included her own battle with the disease and surgery. She would go on to win eight more Emmys.

In July 2012, Moore was chosen to replace Monica Kaufman Pearson, who was retiring as anchor of the 5:00, 6:00 and 11:00 evening newscasts, alongside Justin Farmer. In 2017, Moore was awarded the Silver Circle by the Southeastern Chapter of the National Academy of Television Arts & Sciences.

Outside of newscasting, she helped out several civic associations and non-profit organizations throughout metro Atlanta and sat in numerous boards of directors, including the Atlanta Association of Black Journalists and the National Association of Black Journalists.

Illness and death
In April 2021, doctors diagnosed Moore with two brain tumors. She underwent successful surgery to remove the tumors, but  was later diagnosed with glioblastoma, an aggressive form of brain cancer. During her hiatus, Sophia Choi, Linda Stouffer, and Lori Wilson, among others took her place on the newscast. Moore died from the disease on October 28, 2021, at the age of 54.

Personal life 
Moore was Catholic.

She was previously married to Sean Griffith, but they divorced in 2014. Together, they had three children: two daughters, Shelby and Lauren, and one son, Joshua.

References

1967 births
2021 deaths
20th-century American journalists
21st-century American journalists
African-American journalists
Bennington College alumni
Columbia University Graduate School of Journalism alumni
Deaths from brain cancer in the United States
Deaths from cancer in Georgia (U.S. state)
Journalists from Arkansas
Journalists from Georgia (U.S. state)
Journalists from New York City
Journalists from Tennessee
Neurological disease deaths in Georgia (U.S. state)
Television anchors from Atlanta
African-American Catholics